Bawley Point is a small coastal hamlet in New South Wales, Australia, in the Shoalhaven with a population of 698 people at the . It is located 30 minutes south of Ulladulla, New South Wales, and 30 minutes north of Batemans Bay on the South Coast of NSW. The town's name is believed to be derived from an Aboriginal word meaning "Brown snake".

Bawley Point is well known throughout the region for its fine beaches and peak surf conditions. There is a butcher, baker, pharmacy, bottle shop, caravan park, real estate agent, hardware, take away, and an IGA store at the local shops.  Bawley Point is well known and frequented by holiday makers from Canberra and Sydney.  Next to this hamlet is the neighbouring Kioloa and Termeil. Bawley Point is served on weekdays by Ulladulla Buslines route 741 twice daily to Kioloa and Ulladulla via Termeil, Tabourie and Burrill Lake. An additional afternoon service runs on school days.

History
On 23 April 1770, James Cook in  made his first recorded direct observation of indigenous Australians at Brush Island near Bawley Point, noting in his journal: "...and were so near the Shore as to distinguish several people upon the Sea beach   they appear'd to be of a very dark or black Colour but whether this was the real colour of their skins or the Clothes they might have on I know not."

On 18 December 1832 Joseph Berryman, overseer at Sydney Stephen's Murramarang land acquisition near Bawley Point, shot dead four Aboriginal Australians in retaliation for the spearing of some cattle. Of those shot, two were an elderly couple and another was a pregnant woman.

Bawley Point had a public school from 1894 to 1909 and 1912 to 1922, classified variously as a "public", "half-time" or  "provisional" school.

Bawley Point was threatened during the 2019-20 Bushfire Season, with local fire Chief Charlie Magnuson calling it "the luckiest village on the South Coast".

Tourism
Bawley Point and the adjacent areas have dozens of accommodation options for tourists, from bush cottages, to home stays and caravan parks. The tourism industry is one of the primary sources of incomes for many in the region. Whilst the majority of visitors come from the nearby capital cities of Canberra and Sydney, Bawley Point hosts many international visitors.

Even in the busier periods of the summer holidays, the area is fortunate to have many beaches which provides the favourite attraction of the area. Surrounded by national parks, the area has bush walking trails, mountain biking and campgrounds.

There are two wineries in the area popular tourist attractions which also bring visitors to the area during the Shoalhaven Winter Wine Festival. Visitors can also enjoy fruit picking at two of the local farms.

In addition to the beaches, the area has a couple lakes and lagoons surrounded by National Parks, these bring tourists to the area for photography, painting and bird watching.

Events
The Bawley Point Iron Man is a popular annual event which takes place in early January at Gannet Beach, local to Bawley Point. The event includes not just "iron man" races (constituted of run/swim/run/paddle/run legs) in both male, female and age categories  but also flag racing and a beach volleyball competition.

Population
In the 2016 Census, there were 698 people in Bawley Point. 80.1% of people were born in Australia and 92.3% of people spoke only English at home. The most common responses for religion were No Religion 40.0% and Anglican 24.2%.

Notes

External links

Towns in the South Coast (New South Wales)
City of Shoalhaven
Coastal towns in New South Wales
Surfing locations in New South Wales